The acronym RCGA can refer to:

The Royal Canadian Golf Association
The Regional Chamber and Growth Association of St. Louis, Missouri